The Aero Club Argentino was founded in 1908 by Jorge Newbery, Aaron de Anchorena, Arturo Luisoni, Horacio Anasagasti, Alberto Mascias, Antonio de Marchi, and Carlos Himshe. Initially the club was dedicated to promoting the spirit of aviation sponsoring early experiences with aerostatic balloons.

It was located on the Villa Los Ombués estate in Barrancas de Belgrano, Buenos Aires, then belonging to local business tycoon Ernesto Tornquist and since demolished and now the location of the Embassy of the German Federal Republic.

References

References

External references
 Aero Club Argentino
 Parque Aerostático del Aero Club Argentino en Belgrano

Aviation in Argentina
Flying clubs